Bhaproda is a village in the Bahadurgarh tehsil in Jhajjar district of the Indian state of Haryana. Located on the Sampla–Jhajjar road, 4 kilometers (2.5 mi) from the National Highway 10 intersection, Bhaproda has a total population of 6,902 as per 2011 census.

References

Villages in Jhajjar district